Tiger is an energy drink, produced by Polish company Maspex.

Facts

Tiger has been branded with a nickname of Polish boxer Dariusz 'Tiger' Michalczewski and promoted with the slogan: "Power is back!” The boxer granted license for the drink manufacturing, distribution and promotion to Maspex company in 2010. The old manufacturer has been forbidden by Polish courts to refer to the brand in any manner.

Tiger is being exported to several countries in the world, including the UK.

Ingredients

Tiger is rich in B vitamins, taurine and caffeine (32 mg/100ml).

List of ingredients

Water
Sugar
Acidity regulators: Citric acid and sodium citrate
Carbon dioxide
Taurine (0.4%)
Flavouring
Caffeine (0.03%)
Inositol (0.02%)
Colours: E 150d
Riboflavin
Enriching substances: Vitamins (niacin, panthotenic acid, vitamin B6, vitamin B12)

Nutrition value in 100ml

Energy: 195kL / 46kcal

Protein: 0g
Carbohydrate: 10.8g of which sugar: 10.8g
Fat: 0g of which saturated fatty acids: 0g
Fibre: 0g
Sodium: 0.1g
Vitamins: Niacin 7.9 mg (44%*), panthotenic acid 1.98 mg (44%*), vitamin B6 2.0 mg (100%*), vitamin B12 0.2μg (20%*).

(*) - % of recommended daily allowance (RDA).

Drink is marketed to sportsmen, and people during increased physical performance or mental effort.

Packaging

Cans
 Tiger 250 mL
 Tiger sugar free 250 mL
 Tiger 4 x 250 mL pack
 Tiger sugar free 4 x 250 mL pack
 Tiger Max 250ml (this variation has 50% more caffeine than the standard 250ml can)

Bottles
 Tiger glass bottle 250 mL
 Tiger Energy Shot (small version of 250 mL can, with same amount of taurine, vitamins etc.)
 Tiger Porsche Design bottle 500 mL
 Tiger Porsche Design bottle 1 l
 Tiger water (energy water)

Other
 Tiger 'Professional' Tablets (10 or 20 per tube) (not available since mid 2010)

References

Polish brands
Energy drinks
Products introduced in 2003
 TigerCola Domain Name available for sale''